Niuland District is the 14th district of the Indian state of Nagaland. It was created on December 18, 2021. The district headquarter is located in the town of Niuland.

History 
Niuland District was created on December 18, 2021 as the 14th district of Nagaland. The new district has the same boundaries as the former Niuland sub-division of Dimapur District.

Geography 
The climate is sub-tropical with a monsoon season.

Demographics 
According to the 2011 census of India the then Niuland circle of Dimapur District had a population of 11,876.

The total literacy rate of Niuland  is 79.48%. The Child sex ratio is 1,036 which is greater than the Average Sex Ratio of 1,011.

Religion 

According to the 2011 official census, Christianity (61.84%) is major religion in Niuland. Hinduism is the second largest religion with 9.4% of the population following.

Transportation

Air 
The nearest airport is Dimapur Airport.

Rail 
The nearest railway station is the Dimapur railway station.

See also 
 Nagaland

References 

Districts of Nagaland
2021 establishments in Nagaland